WAPN (91.5 MHz) is a non-commercial, listener-supported FM radio station broadcasting a Christian talk and teaching radio format. Licensed to Holly Hill, Florida, the station serves the Daytona Beach area.  The station is currently owned by Public Radio, Inc.  Programming is simulcast on 91.7 WAPB in Madison, Florida.

Popular WAPN programs include Prayerline, Miracles Today with Pastor Chris Sarno, Lighthouse for Christ with Pastor Ron Fussell, Pavlina's Kidz Place with Pavlina Osta, and He Loves Even Me Ministries with Carl Harrington.

References

External links

APN
Radio stations established in 1973
1973 establishments in Florida